Mortal Kombat is an American series of martial arts action films based on the fighting video game series of the same name by Midway Games. The first film was produced by Lawrence Kasanoff’s Threshold Entertainment.

The first film, Mortal Kombat, was released in 1995 and its sequel, Mortal Kombat: Annihilation, was released in 1997. After the two films, game publisher Midway filed for bankruptcy. Warner Bros., having become the parent of New Line Cinema in 2008 (after over a decade of both operating as separate divisions of Time Warner), made a bid to purchase most of Midway's assets, including Mortal Kombat. In June 2009, Kasanoff and Threshold sued in bankruptcy court, arguing that they owned the copyright to many of the characters from the series.
 
On July 1, 2009, the bankruptcy court approved the sale of most of Midway's assets to Warner Bros. subject to the intellectual property claims of Threshold Entertainment. After years of development hell, a reboot of the series was released in April 2021.

Films

Live-action

Mortal Kombat (1995)

Three unknown martial artists are summoned to a mysterious island to compete in a tournament whose outcome will decide the fate of the world.

Mortal Kombat: Annihilation (1997)

A group of martial arts warriors have only six days to save the Earth from an extra-dimensional invasion.

Mortal Kombat (2021)

A washed-up mixed martial arts fighter named Cole Young is unaware of his hidden lineage or why assassin Sub Zero is hunting him down. Concerned for the safety of his family, he seeks out a clique of fighters that were chosen to defend Earthrealm against Outworld.

Animated

Mortal Kombat: The Journey Begins (1995)
On April 11, 1995, New Line Home Video, Turner Home Entertainment and Threshold Entertainment released a tie-in animated film on VHS and Laserdisc, titled Mortal Kombat: The Journey Begins. Serving as a prequel to the feature film, it follows the protagonists Liu Kang, Johnny Cage and Sonya Blade as they travel on a mysterious boat to the Mortal Kombat tournament. On the way they meet Raiden, who provides them with some hints about how to survive the tournament and defeat Shang Tsung and his army of Tarkatan minions. Upon arriving at the island where the battles takes place, Raiden retells the origins of Shang Tsung, Goro, Scorpion, Sub-Zero and the Great Kung Lao in between fight scenes.

The film featured a combination of traditional animation, motion capture, and CGI to explain the origins behind some of the movie's main characters, as well as a fifteen-minute behind-the-scenes documentary of the theatrical release. Trailers of the film were seen on the promotional screener VHS copy, and on other VHS releases from Turner Home Entertainment and New Line Home Video. The film was included on the Mortal Kombat Blu-ray released in April 2011.

Mortal Kombat Legends: Scorpion's Revenge (2020)

A direct-to-video animated film called Mortal Kombat Legends: Scorpion's Revenge was released by Warner Bros. Animation on digital April 14, 2020, and on Blu-ray, DVD, and 4K Ultra HD on April 28. The film is directed by Ethan Spaulding and written by Jeremy Adams. The voice cast includes Patrick Seitz as Scorpion, Steve Blum as Sub-Zero, Darin De Paul as Quan Chi, Jordan Rodrigues as Liu Kang, Joel McHale as Johnny Cage, & Jennifer Carpenter as Sonya Blade. Kevin Michael Richardson also reprises his role of Goro from the 1995 live action film. The film's premise centers around Scorpion seeking revenge on those who murdered his family and clan, after being resurrected by Quan Chi, while Liu Kang, Johnny Cage, and Sonya Blade are chosen to participate in the Mortal Kombat tournament to save Earthrealm from Outworld.

Mortal Kombat Legends: Battle of the Realms (2021)

A sequel, entitled Mortal Kombat Legends: Battle of the Realms, with most of the cast and crew from Scorpion's Revenge, was released on August 31, 2021.

Mortal Kombat Legends: Snow Blind (2022)

Mortal Kombat Legends: Cage Match (2023)

In an interview in October 2022,  Jeremy Adams revealed that he is writing the 4th MK Legends film.

Cast and crew

Recurring cast and characters

Crew

Reception

Box office performance

Critical and public response

Music

Novelizations
A novelization of the first movie by "Martin Delrio" (James D. Macdonald and Debra Doyle) was released through Tor Books. It is based on an early version of the film's script, and as such it includes several deleted or unfilmed scenes, such as a fight between Sonya Blade and Jade.

Notes

References

External links
 
 
 

American film series
Martial arts film series
Film series introduced in 1995
New Line Cinema franchises
Warner Bros. Pictures franchises